Chengmai County (postal: Tsingmai) is a county in Hainan, China. It is one of four counties of Hainan.  Its postal code is 571900. In 2002, its population was 490,800.

History
The first record of Chengmai County is in 110 BC, when it referred to as Guo County in one of Emperor Wu of Han's records. The county acquired its current name under the Sui Dynasty reorganisation of 607. It was also recorded during the Ming Dynasty.

Geography

More than 20 rivers flow through the county, providing  of water per year.

Jinjiang Town

The main settlement in the county is Jinjiang. It is located directly on the north side of the Nandu River and essentially occupies the south face of a large hill. The old section is located by the river with newer buildings further up. The backside of the hill is currently under development with mostly high-rise apartments being built. Many government buildings are situated on the top of the hill. Near the centre of the hill, there is a large park.

Economy
The main industry is mining, with more than ten resources available within the county including quartz, stone, limestone, crystals, gold, silver, peat, zinc, aluminium, iron ore, kaolin, and manganese. Over 5 billion tonnes of quartz are still unmined in the county, with an average grade of 99.5% silicon.

Fishing also makes up a large part, with the county possessing  of coastline. Apart from farm fishing, marine catches include mackerel, redfish, croaker fish, grouper, pomfret, tuna, squid, cuttlefish, lobster and shrimp, are fished in the harbour at Tu Beach. The diverse and populous fish are a result of a nutrient-rich sediment at the bottom of the harbour.

Demographics
The Han people account for 99.5% of the population of the county.

Longevity
The people of Chengmai County live to an average of 77.79 years. Among the population are 215 centenarians. The proportion of centenarians compared to the rest of the county's population, and the overall number, ranks highest of all cities and counties in China.

Of the total 565,000 people living in the county, 18,500 are more than 80 years old, 896 of which are couples.

Climate

See also
 List of administrative divisions of Hainan

References

Citations

Sources

External links

 Official website (Chinese)

Chengmai County